is a Japanese term for a lineage chart in Zen Buddhism and some other Japanese schools, documenting the "bloodline" of succession of various masters or listing priests in a particular school. In Zen the kechimyaku theoretically links a student to all previous generations back to the Buddha himself. In the Sōtō school of medieval Japan it became commonplace for the kechimyaku to be administered to lay students for such rituals as the jukai ceremony. Traditionally this document is administered at the time of Dharma transmission in Soto Zen, during a shiho ceremony. In the Jodo Shinshu sect the kechimyaku is meant to demonstrate "spiritual descent", and not a blood heritage.

See also
Dharma transmission
Inka
Shiho

References

Sources

Zen